Romper Room is an American children's television series that was franchised and syndicated from 1953 to 1994. The program targeted preschoolers (children five years of age or younger), and was created and produced by Bert Claster and his presenter wife, Nancy, of Claster Television. The national version was presented by Nancy Terrell. Romper Room was also franchised internationally at various times in Canada, the United Kingdom, Japan, Finland, New Zealand, Puerto Rico, Paraguay and Australia.

Founding

American television franchises and syndications
Romper Room was a rare case of a series being both franchised and syndicated, and it was also revealed that local affiliates—Los Angeles and New York being prime examples—would produce their own versions of the show instead of airing the national telecast. For some time, local shows all over the world used the same script but with local children; some affiliates, starting with KWEX-TV in San Antonio, translated the scripts into Spanish for local airings. Kids would be on waiting lists for years (sometimes before birth) to be on the show. It was called "an actual kindergarten". Originally filmed in Baltimore from its inception in 1953, Romper Room eventually moved its broadcast facilities to Chicago and then moved back to Baltimore in 1981.

Episode format
Each program opens with a greeting from the hostess and the Pledge of Allegiance in American broadcasts. The hostess and her group of children then embark on 30 or 60 minutes of games, exercises, songs, story-telling and moral lessons, which were regularly accompanied by background music. The hostess (or sometimes the children in cadence) would ask, "Mr. Music, please!" or "We're ready, Mr. Music", to prompt the background music. The young cast, which ranged from four to five years old, was rotated every two months, with many of the hostesses having prior experience working with small children and many being former kindergarten teachers.

Etiquette was a focus of Romper Room. The hostesses were always addressed as "Miss", The show also had a mascot, Mr. Do-Bee. Mr. Do-Bee was an oversized bumblebee who came to teach the children proper deportment. He was noted for always starting his sentence with "Do Bee", as in the imperative "Do be"; for example, "Do Bee good boys and girls for your parents!" There was also a "Mr. Don't Bee" to show children exactly what they should not do. Do-Bee balloons were made available for purchase to the public. Each balloon featured a painted sketch of Do-Bee. When the balloons were inflated and then released, they would fly around slowly and emit a buzzing sound.

The hostess would also serve milk and cookies to the children. Before eating, they would recite the celebrated Romper Room prayer: "God is great, God is good. Let us thank Him for our food. Amen."

At the end of each broadcast, the hostess would look through a "magic mirror"—actually an open frame with a handle, the size, and shape of a hand mirror—and recite the rhyme, "Romper, bomper, stomper boo. Tell me, tell me, tell me, do. Magic Mirror, tell me today, did all my friends have fun at play?" She would then name the children she saw in "television land", saying, for example, "I can see Kathleen and Owen and Julie and Jimmy and Kelly and Tommy and Bobby and Jennifer and Martin" and so forth. Children were encouraged to mail in their names, which would be read on the air (first names only).

The show used the then-popular Mattel Jack-in-the-box  (sometimes called "Happy Jack") for its opening and closing titles, with its traditional nursery rhyme "Pop Goes the Weasel" as a theme song, but, from 1981 onwards, a new original theme song was used.

Romper Room and Friends
In 1981, the format of Romper Room was overhauled and re-titled Romper Room and Friends. One hundred syndicated versions were taped in Baltimore with Molly McCloskey (credited as Molly McCloskey-Barber after 1985) as host. At that point, they no longer used teachers. The biggest change to the program was the introduction of a series of new puppet characters, including a full costume character named Kimble and puppets named Granny Cat and Up-Up. Kimble and Up-Up  were performed by Bruce Edward Hall and Granny Cat by McCloskey, a.k.a. "Miss Molly". The three characters were developed by The Great Jones Studios in NYC.  The new characters starred in a series of vignettes, somewhat similar to the "Neighborhood of Make-Believe" segments on Mister Rogers' Neighborhood, and were meant to introduce or reinforce simple moral lessons. About 100 of these skits — each running three to five minutes — were produced for insertion into local Romper Room programs; the host would introduce each segment and comment after its conclusion.

In addition, a new opening and closing credits sequence, and lyrical theme – "Romper Room and Friends", containing mostly nonsensical lyrics, but also naming the characters Up-Up, Do Bee, Granny Cat, and Kimble in the lyrics as well – were introduced, replacing the "Pop Goes the Weasel" theme that had been used.  New songs/music beds were also created and composed by David Spangler including a somber Magic Mirror theme.  Additionally, two British made shows, Paddington (narrated by Michael Hordern) and Simon in the Land of Chalk Drawings (narrated by Bernard Cribbins) were also featured.

The last host of the syndicated series was Sharon Jeffery, the only African-American to host the show. Miss Sharon hosted the show from 1987 until the series was last filmed in 1992, although new episodes were aired until 1994. Jeffery's shows were filmed at KTVU in Oakland, California.

Broadcast information

Nancy Cledenin Terrell (born 1940, Richmond, Virginia) (known to audiences as "Miss Nancy") was the national hostess in the 1960s and early 1970s, when Romper Room was seen on ABC-owned and operated stations throughout the United States in locales that did not have their own hostesses.

See also
 Ding Dong School

References

External links
 
 Romper Room info from tvparty.com

1953 American television series debuts
1950s American children's television series
1960s American children's television series
1970s American children's television series
1980s American children's television series
1990s American children's television series
1994 American television series endings
American preschool education television series
American television shows featuring puppetry
Black-and-white American television shows
1950s preschool education television series
1960s preschool education television series
1970s preschool education television series
1980s preschool education television series
1990s preschool education television series
English-language television shows
Franchised television formats
Local children's television programming in the United States
Television series by Claster Television
First-run syndicated television programs in the United States